Zahid Nisar Quraishi (born July 19, 1975) is a United States district judge of the United States District Court for the District of New Jersey and a former United States magistrate judge of the same court. He is the first Muslim Article III judge in the United States.

Early life and education 

Quraishi was born in New York City and raised in Fanwood, New Jersey, by his parents Shahida P. Quraishi and Dr. Nisar A. Quraishi, immigrants from Pakistan. He graduated in 1993 from Scotch Plains-Fanwood High School. He received his Bachelor of Arts from the John Jay College of Criminal Justice in 1997, and his Juris Doctor from Rutgers Law School in 2000.

Career 

Upon graduating from law school, Quraishi served as a law clerk to Judge Edwin Stern of the New Jersey Superior Court from 2000 to 2001. From 2001 to 2003, he worked as a litigation associate at LeBoeuf, Lamb, Greene & MacRae in Newark, New Jersey.

Military service 

In June 2003, Quraishi left his law firm to join the United States Army Judge Advocate General's Corps, attaining the rank of captain, before being honorably discharged in 2007. During this time, Quraishi was stationed in Germany and deployed twice to Iraq in support of the Iraq War, both in 2004 and 2006.

Legal career 

In 2007, Quraishi became an assistant chief counsel in the Office of the Chief Counsel at U.S. Immigration and Customs Enforcement in New York City for approximately one year. He later became an Assistant United States Attorney for the United States Attorney's Office for the District of New Jersey, from 2008 to 2013. Before becoming a judge, Quraishi was an attorney at Morristown's Riker, Danzig, Scherer, Hyland & Perretti LLP, and was a partner at the firm from 2016–2019. Quraishi taught courses on trial presentation at Rutgers Law School in the fall of 2020 and spring of 2021.

Federal judicial service

United States magistrate judge service 

Quraishi served as a United States magistrate judge of the United States District Court for the District of New Jersey, a position he was appointed to on June 3, 2019, and left in 2021 upon becoming a district judge. He was the first Asian-American to sit on the federal bench in New Jersey.

District court service 

On March 30, 2021, President Joe Biden announced his intent to nominate Quraishi to serve as a United States district judge of the United States District Court for the District of New Jersey. On April 19, 2021, his nomination was sent to the Senate. President Biden nominated Quraishi to the seat vacated by Judge Peter G. Sheridan, who assumed senior status on June 14, 2018. Quraishi was recommended by Senator Cory Booker. On April 28, 2021, a hearing on his nomination was held before the Senate Judiciary Committee. On May 20, 2021, his nomination was reported out of committee by a 19–3 vote. On June 10, 2021, the United States Senate invoked cloture on his nomination by a 83–16 vote. His nomination was confirmed later that day by a 81–16 vote. Upon confirmation, he became the first Muslim-American to serve on a federal district court as an Article III judge. He received his judicial commission on June 22, 2021.

Quraishi's nomination drew scrutiny from some Muslim American advocates, who criticized the Biden administration for sidestepping a number of Muslim American civil rights organizations to nominate Quraishi. Critics said many of Quraishi's legal positions are unknown, and that his past work for U.S. Immigration and Customs Enforcement and his role as a "detention advisor" in the Iraq war raised questions about his stance on civil rights.

See also 
 List of American Muslims

References

External links 
 
 

1975 births
Living people
21st-century American lawyers
21st-century American judges
American Muslims
American people of Pakistani descent
Assistant United States Attorneys
John Jay College of Criminal Justice alumni
United States Army Judge Advocate General's Corps
Judges of the United States District Court for the District of New Jersey
Lawyers from New York City
New Jersey lawyers
People from Fanwood, New Jersey
Rutgers Law School alumni
Scotch Plains-Fanwood High School alumni
United States Army officers
United States Department of Homeland Security officials
United States magistrate judges
United States district court judges appointed by Joe Biden